Cyperus nervosostriatus is a species of sedge that is native to northern parts of South Africa.

See also 
 List of Cyperus species

References 

nervosostriatus
Plants described in 1925
Flora of South Africa
Taxa named by William Bertram Turrill